A list of films produced in South Korea in 1981:

References

External links
1981 in South Korea

 1980-1989 at www.koreanfilm.org

1981
South Korean
1981 in South Korea